Europabanan (the Europe line) is a proposed high-speed railway between Jönköping and Scania in Sweden.  The speed is planned to be 320 km/h. In Jönköping it will connect to Götalandsbanan, the planned high-speed railway Stockholm-Göteborg.

Previous proposals
There is also a proposal, but no real plan, to build a railway between Helsingborg and Copenhagen, including the HH Tunnel under the Öresund. The rail track on the current Öresund bridge is congested.

Europabanan will, if built, be used for passenger trains going between Copenhagen-Stockholm, Malmö-Stockholm, Helsingborg-Stockholm, Helsingborg-Jönköping and more connections. The travel time Malmö-Stockholm is expected to be around 3 hours compared to 4.5 hours today. The travel time Helsingborg-Jönköping would be cut by 2 hours compared to today. The disadvantage with the project is the big cost.

Feasibility study
There is a feasibility study ordered by the government supporting the idea about the Europabanan. The study did not include the Öresund tunnel. There is no further planning done. This is in contrast to Götalandsbanan which has a detailed plan along half its stretch and (in 2010) one being made for the rest of that railway. There is no decision to build any part of these railways.

The expected cost is at least 40 billion SEK for Europabanan, not counting the connection to Denmark, an amount that caused political hesitation.

Negotiations
In February 2016 negotiations were started with municipalities for financing a high-speed rail between Stockholm and Malmö, with stations in Jönköping, Värnamo, Hässleholm and Lund.

References

External links
Europakorridoren, a lobbyist organisation owned by concerned cities
Sverigeförhandlingen, a negotiation organisation set up by the Swedish government

Rail transport in Skåne County
High-speed railway lines in Sweden
Proposed public transport in Sweden
Rail transport in the Øresund Region